Faruk Ihtijarević (born 1 May 1976) is a Bosnian retired professional footballer who played as a midfielder.

Club career
Ihtijarević had a brief spell with Zadar in the Croatian 1. HNL. Outside of Bosnia and Herzegovina, apart from Zadar, he also played for Slovenian club NK Maribor and Iranian club PAS Hamedan F.C.

Ihtijarević's biggest success was with NK Bosna Visoko, NK Maribor and FK Sarajevo. For Sarajevo he made over 100 league appearances.

International career
He made his debut for Bosnia and Herzegovina in a January 1999 friendly match away against Malta and has earned a total of 9 caps, scoring 1 goal. His final international was a March 2000 friendly against Macedonia.

International goals

Honours

Player
Sarajevo
Bosnian Premier League: 1998–99, 2006–07
Bosnian Cup: 1996–97, 1997–98, 2004–05
Bosnian Supercup: 1997

Maribor
Slovenian PrvaLiga: 2000–01

See also
NK Maribor players

References

External links

1976 births
Living people
People from Visoko
Association football midfielders
Bosnia and Herzegovina footballers
Bosnia and Herzegovina under-21 international footballers
Bosnia and Herzegovina international footballers
NK Bosna Visoko players
FK Željezničar Sarajevo players
NK Maribor players
NK Zadar players
FK Sarajevo players
Pas players
Premier League of Bosnia and Herzegovina players
Slovenian PrvaLiga players
Croatian Football League players
Persian Gulf Pro League players
Bosnia and Herzegovina expatriate footballers
Expatriate footballers in Slovenia
Bosnia and Herzegovina expatriate sportspeople in Slovenia
Expatriate footballers in Croatia
Bosnia and Herzegovina expatriate sportspeople in Croatia
Expatriate footballers in Iran
Bosnia and Herzegovina expatriate sportspeople in Iran
Bosniaks of Bosnia and Herzegovina